Nicholas Wulstan Park  (born 6 December 1958) is a  British animator who created Wallace and Gromit, Creature Comforts, Chicken Run, Shaun the Sheep, and Early Man. Park has been nominated for an Academy Award a total of six times and won four with Creature Comforts (1989), The Wrong Trousers (1993), A Close Shave (1995) and Wallace & Gromit: The Curse of the Were-Rabbit (2005).

He has also received five BAFTA Awards, including the BAFTA for Best Short Animation for A Matter of Loaf and Death, which was also the most watched television programme in the United Kingdom in 2008. His 2000 film Chicken Run is the highest-grossing stop motion animated film.

For his work in animation, in 2012, Park was among the British cultural icons selected by artist Peter Blake to appear in a new version of Blake's most famous artwork—the Beatles' Sgt. Pepper's Lonely Hearts Club Band album cover—to celebrate the British cultural figures of his life.

Early life 
Nicholas Wulstan Park was born on 6 December 1958 in Preston, Lancashire, to seamstress Mary Cecilia (née Ashton; born 1930) and Roger Wulstan Park (1925–2004), an architectural photographer. The middle child of five siblings, he grew up on Penwortham; the family later moved to Walmer Bridge. His sister Janet lives in Longton, Lancashire. He attended Cuthbert Mayne High School (now Our Lady's Catholic High School).

Park grew up with a keen interest in drawing cartoons, and as a 13-year-old made films with the help of his mother and her home film camera and cotton bobbins. He also took after his father, an amateur inventor, and would send homemade items like a bottle that squeezed out different coloured wools in to Blue Peter.

He studied Communication Arts at Sheffield City Polytechnic (now Sheffield Hallam University) and then went to the National Film and Television School, where he started making the first Wallace and Gromit film, A Grand Day Out.

Career 
In 1985, Park joined the staff of Aardman Animations in Bristol, where he worked as an animator on commercial products (including the music video for Peter Gabriel's "Sledgehammer", where he worked on the dance scene involving oven-ready chickens). He also had a part in animating the Penny cartoons from the first season of Pee-wee's Playhouse, which featured Paul Reubens as his character Pee-wee Herman.

Along with all this, he had finally completed A Grand Day Out, and with that in post production, he made Creature Comforts as his contribution to a series of shorts called "Lip Synch". Creature Comforts matched animated zoo animals with a soundtrack of people talking about their homes. The two films were nominated for a host of awards. A Grand Day Out beat Creature Comforts for the BAFTA Award, but it was Creature Comforts that won Park his first Oscar.

In 1990, Park worked alongside advertising agency GGK to develop a series of highly acclaimed television advertisements for the "Heat Electric" campaign. The Creature Comforts advertisements are now regarded as among the best advertisements ever shown on British television, as voted (independently) by viewers of the United Kingdom's main commercial channels ITV and Channel 4.

Two more Wallace and Gromit shorts, The Wrong Trousers (1993) and A Close Shave (1995), followed, both winning Oscars. He then made his first feature-length film, Chicken Run (2000), co-directed with Aardman founder Peter Lord. He also supervised a new series of Creature Comforts films for British television in 2003.

His second theatrical feature-length film and first Wallace and Gromit feature, Wallace & Gromit: The Curse of the Were-Rabbit, was released on 5 October 2005, and won Best Animated Feature Oscar at the 78th Academy Awards, 6 March 2006.

On 10 October 2005, a fire gutted one of Aardman Animations' archive warehouses. The fire resulted in the loss of some of Park's creations, including the models and sets used in the movie Chicken Run. Some of the original Wallace and Gromit models and sets, as well as the master prints of the finished films, were elsewhere and survived.

In 2007 and 2008, Park's work included a United States version of Creature Comforts, a weekly television series that was on CBS every Monday evening at 8 pm ET. In the series, Americans were interviewed about a range of subjects. The interviews were lip-synced to Aardman animal characters.

In September 2007, it was announced that Park had been commissioned to design a bronze statue of Wallace and Gromit, which will be placed in his home town of Preston. In October 2007, it was announced that the BBC had commissioned another Wallace and Gromit short film to be entitled Trouble at Mill (retitled later to A Matter of Loaf and Death).

Park studied at Preston College, which has since named its library for the art and design department after him: the Nick Park Library Learning Centre. He is the recipient of a gold Blue Peter badge.

By the beginning of 2010, Park had won four Academy Awards, and had the distinction of having won an Academy Award every time he had been nominated (his only loss being when he was nominated twice in the same category). This streak ended in the 2010 Oscars when A Matter of Loaf and Death failed to win the best animated short Academy Award.

Park had his first acting role in February 2011, voicing himself in a cameo on The Simpsons episode "Angry Dad: The Movie". In the episode, the fictional Park's new Willis and Crumble short, Better Gnomes and Gardens, is a parody of Wallace and Gromit.

In the end of 2011, Park directed a music video for "Plain Song"—a song by Native and the Name, a Sheffield band led by Joe Rose, the son of an old university friend. The video was filmed at Birkdale School, Sheffield, and Park also selected the track as one of his Desert Island Discs when he went on the show in 2011, which led to suggestions that Park was using his fame to give a friend a leg up in his career. Park denied these claims, insisting it had become one of his favourite songs. The song and video can be found on YouTube.

In April 2013, Park was involved in the British stage adaptation of Hayao Miyazaki's animated film, Princess Mononoke. He was the executive producer of Shaun the Sheep Movie and he also voiced himself in a cameo.

For 2018, he directed another Aardman Animations stop-motion film, titled Early Man, which tells a story of a caveman who unites his tribe against the Bronze Age while unintentionally inventing football.

On 21 May 2019, Park announced that a new Wallace and Gromit project is currently in the works, with no projected release date. In January 2022, Park announced that a new untitled television film is currently in production for release at Christmas 2024 for the BBC and Netflix.

Personal life 
The Daily Telegraph remarked Park has taken on some attributes of Wallace, just "as dog owners come to look like their pets", overexpressing himself, possibly as a result of having to show animators how he wants his characters to behave.

Park married Mags Connolly at the Gibbon Bridge Hotel near Chipping on 16 September 2016. Although by his own admission, he was not especially interested in football growing up, he has always nominally supported his hometown's local team, Preston North End.

Awards and nominations

'Preston Legend'
In 2016, and following a vote by students on a number of nominated 'Preston Legends', the University of Central Lancashire named one of three new meeting rooms in the students' union after Park, who was born in the city where it is based. In response, Park sent the university a message to say how honoured he was by it.

Influences
Nick Park has stated that his main influences have been Ray Harryhausen, Oliver Postgate, Peter Firmin, Chuck Jones, Yuri Norstein, Richard Williams, Terry Gilliam, and Bob Godfrey. He is a Gerry Anderson fan.

He is a fan of The Beano comic, and guest-edited the 70th-anniversary issue dated 2 August 2008. He also contributed to Classics from the Comics at the same time, picking his favourite classic stories for the comic reprint magazine's new Classic Choice feature.

His film-making ideas were encouraged by his old English teacher; however, Park has denied that the character of Wallace was based on him.

Filmography

Feature films

Short films

Television and web series

Music videos

Commercials 
 Burger King commercials 
 The Electricity Association

Video games 
 Wallace & Gromit Fun Pack (1996)
 Wallace & Gromit Fun Pack 2 (2000)

References

External links 

 "Making His Mark in Clay: An Interview with Nick Park" Nick Park speaks about his influences, on how he uses drawing to tell a story and tells what it was like to bring Wallace and Gromit to the big screen

1958 births
Living people
Aardman Animations people
Alumni of Sheffield Hallam University
Alumni of the National Film and Television School
Animation screenwriters
Annie Award winners
British animated film directors
British male television writers
British television producers
Clay animators
Commanders of the Order of the British Empire
Directors of Best Animated Feature Academy Award winners
Directors of Best Animated Short Academy Award winners
English animators
English film directors
English film producers
English male screenwriters
English screenwriters
English television directors
English television producers
English television writers
Mass media people from Preston, Lancashire
Royal Designers for Industry
Wallace and Gromit